The  Oakland Raiders season was the franchise's 26th season in the National Football League, the 36th overall, and their first back in Oakland since 1981. The Raiders announced their return to Oakland on June 25, 1995, and the Alameda County Board of Supervisors approved it the next month. While the Raiders raced out to an impressive 8–2 start, a number of key injuries (including the loss of starting quarterback Jeff Hostetler) caused them to lose their final six games and miss the playoffs. The Raiders, for the first time since 1962 (and joining the NFL), finished at the bottom of their division, the AFC West, ending a streak of 32 consecutive non-last place finishes. It was also the solitary season from 1963 to 2003 where they finished last place in their division.

Offseason

NFL draft

Roster

Schedule

Game summaries

Week 1

Standings

References

Oakland
Oakland Raiders seasons
Oakland